Modern music may refer to:

Albums
Modern Music (Brad Mehldau and Kevin Hays album), 2010
Modern Music (Be-Bop Deluxe album), 1976

General music
 20th-century music
 20th-century classical music
 21st-century classical music
 Contemporary classical music
 Modernism (music)
 Modern jazz
 Modern rock
 Popular music

Other uses
 Modern Music (Australian record label), of bands such as The Tenants
 Modern Music (German record label), affiliated with Noise Records
 Modern Music (magazine), an American magazine published by Minna Lederman

See also
 Modern Records, an American label active from the 1940s to 1960s
 Modern Records (1980), an American label active from 1980 to 1999
 New music (disambiguation)